Pit Schubert (born 2 December 1935 in Wrocław) is a German non-fiction author, climber and mountaineer. He is the founder and former head of the safety commission of the German Alpine Club (DAV).

Life

Schubert started climbing and mountaineering at the age of 17. He became known for both his first ascents and his adherence to alpine doctrines.

He is a qualified engineer, and worked for approximately 15 years in the aerospace industry. In 1968, he was a founding member of the DAV Safety Group, which he chaired until retiring in 2000. He was also president of the UIAA Safety Commission. He worked to standardize climbing equipment, prevented innumerable accidents, and he stated that  "At that time man was making the first flight to the moon a reality, but we were still using ice axes with wooden shafts – which could break on the first use on the ice – so a lot of things were waiting to be done.” .

First ascents

1967: Piz Ciavazes, South Wall, Via Schubert ( VI + , 220 m), Sellagruppe, Dolomites
1968: Guglia di Brenta, SW-edge, Schubert / Werner ( VI, 380 m), Brenta group, Dolomites
1969: First ascent of the Roc Noir (Khangsar Kang, 7485 m), Karakorum
1975: Fleischbank, Neue Ostwand, Pohlke / Schubert (VIII, 360 m), Kaisergebirge
1976: First ascent of the south flank of Annapurna IV (7525 m), Annapurna Massif

Books

Modern Felstechnik, Bergverlag Rother, 1975
The application of the rope in ice and rock, Bergverlag Rother, 1998, 
Alpine rope technique for beginners and advanced, Bergverlag Rother, 2000, 
(Alpine club leader extreme) Kaisergebirge, Bergverlag Rudolf Rother, 2000. 
Via ferrata, Bergverlag Rother, 2003, 
Safety and Risk in Rock and Ice, Bergverlag Rother, Volume 1, 7th Edition, 2004,  ; Volume 2, 2002,  ; Volume 3, 2006, 
Alpine Curriculum, Vol. 5: Safety at the Mountain, BLV Verlagsgesellschaft, 2003, 
Anecdotes from the mountain: Amusing stories of mountaineering, climbing and skiing, Bergverlag Rother, 2010,

References

1935 births
German mountain climbers
German engineers
German non-fiction writers
Living people